Mark Skidmore is an American economist. He is Professor of Economics and Agricultural, Food, and Resource Economics at Michigan State University, where he holds the Morris Chair in State and Local Government Finance and Policy. Skidmore completed his undergraduate education at the University of Washington and received a Ph.D. in economics from the University of Colorado in 1994 for his dissertation "State Responses to Fiscal Stress".

In the spring of 2017, Skidmore discovered $21 trillion in unauthorized government spending in the United States Department of Defense's budget.

Further reading 
Dave Lindorff: Exclusive: The Pentagon’s Massive Accounting Fraud Exposed How US military spending keeps rising even as the Pentagon flunks its audit, November 27, 2018
The Solari Report - THE MISSING MONEY
Mark Skidmore's Personal Web page

References

American economists
Michigan State University faculty
University of Washington alumni
Living people
Year of birth missing (living people)